Srikant Gautam is a popular Indian song lyricist and director who works in the Odia film industry. After penning the lyrics for many popular songs, Srikant made his debut as a director with Mitha Mitha (2017).

Career

Filmography
Music:
 2017 Mitha Mitha (lyricist) 
 2015 Raghupati Raghaba Rajaram (lyricist) 
 2014 One Way Traffic (lyricist) 
 2014 Golapi Golapi (lyricist) 
 2014 Akhire Akhire (lyricist) 
 2013 Paribeni Kehi Alaga Kari (lyricist) 
 2012 Raja Jhia Sathe Heigala Bhaba (lyricist) 
 2010 Aakhi Palakare Tu (lyricist) 
 2009 Pagala Karichi Paunji Tora (lyricist) 
 2006 Rakhi Bandhili Mo Rakhiba Mana (lyricist) 
 2002 Rahichi Rahibi Tori Paain (lyricist) 
 2000 Bou (lyricist) 
 1998 Santana (lyricist) 
 1995 Rakata Kahiba Kie Kahara (lyricist) 
 1994 Sakhi Rahila Ae Singha Duara (lyricist)

Actor:
 2017 Mitha Mitha  ( Rama Hari Dash )
 2014 One Way Traffic Commissioner Abhinabh Sharma 
 1999 Ei Akhi Ama Sakhi 
 1997 Bapa 
 1994 Aemiti Bhai Jagate Nahin 
 1994 Pacheri Uthila Majhi Duaru Prakash Sahu
 1993 Pathara Khasuchi Bada Deulu 
 1989 Jaa Devi Sarva Bhuteshu 
 1989 Panchu Pandav 
 1986 Bagula Baguli 
 1984 Dora 
 1979 Mathura Bijaya Krushna

Writer:
 2017 Mitha Mitha (dialogue / story)
 Raghupati Raghaba Rajaram (dialogue) 
 2014 One Way Traffic (dialogue / story) 
 2014 Pagala Karichu Tu (dialogue) 
 2014 Lekhu Lekhu Lekhi Deli (dialogue) 
 2014 Golapi Golapi (dialogue) 
 2014 Akhire Akhire (dialogue by)

References

External links
 

Male actors in Odia cinema
Indian lyricists